Bidar may refer to the following :

Places 
 in Karnataka state, southern India 
 Bidar, city 
 Bidar railway station
 Bidar Airport
 Bidar Subah, a former Mughal imperial province
 Bidar Sultanate, one of the late medieval Deccan sultanates
 Bidar taluka
 Bidar district, district in the state of Karnataka.
 Bidar (Lok Sabha constituency)

 In Iran
 Bid Darreh, also known as Bīdar, a village of Iran.
 Shabandar, also known as Shab Bīdār, a village of Iran.

People 
 Abdennour Bidar (born 1971), French writer and philosopher
 Martin Bidař (born 1999), Czech pair skater
 Petr Bidař (born 1991), Czech pair skater
 Rafiullah Bidar, Afghan human rights worker
 Bidar Kadınefendi (1858–1918), fourth wife of Sultan Abdul Hamid II of the Ottoman Empire

See also